Magomed Magomed-Sultanovich Magomedov (born 11 December 1987) is a former Russian professional footballer.

Club career
He made his professional debut in the Russian First Division in 2003 for FC Anzhi Makhachkala.

References

1987 births
Living people
Russian footballers
FC Anzhi Makhachkala players
Russian Premier League players
Russian people of Dagestani descent
Association football forwards
PFC Krylia Sovetov Samara players